Ahrensburg West is a station on the Großhansdorf branch of Hamburg U-Bahn line U1, located in the southwestern part of the town of Ahrensburg in Schleswig-Holstein.

History
The station was built based on schematics by Eugen Göbel, and was opened on November 5, 1921, under the name "Ahrensburg" with only one track. The second track at the station was added in 1957.

When the next stop on the line, "Hopfenbach," was renamed to Ahrensburg Ost in 1952, "Ahrensburg" station was renamed to Ahrensburg West to avoid confusion between the two stations.

Services
Ahrensburg West is served by Hamburg U-Bahn line U1.

References

U-Bahn West
U1 (Hamburg U-Bahn) stations
Hamburg U-Bahn stations in Schleswig-Holstein
Buildings and structures in Stormarn (district)
Railway stations in Germany opened in 1921